Temognatha aestimata is a jewel beetle in the family Buprestidae, found in Victoria.
It was first described in 1898 by Charles Kerremans as Stigmodera aestimata.

The adults are diurnal, and eat flowers. The larvae are wood-borers.

See also
Woodboring beetle

References

Insects of Australia
Buprestidae
Woodboring beetles
Beetles described in 1898